The following is a timeline of the history of the city of Bilbao in the Biscay province of Spain.

Prior to 19th century

 1300 – Bilbao founded by Diego López V de Haro.
 1397 – Santiago Cathedral built (approximate date).
 1510 – Church of San Antón built.
 1511
 Consulado established.
 Basilica of Begoña construction begins.
 1795 – July: Town occupied by French forces.

19th century
 1804 –  conflict.
 1808 – French occupation begins.
 1813 – French occupation ends.
 1833 – Biscay Province established.
 1836 – December: Battle of Luchana.
 1845 – Arenal Bridge constructed.
 1846 – Fabrica de Nuestra Senora de la Merced (steel mill) in business near town.
 1855 – Fabrica de Nuestra Senora del Carmen in business.
 1857 – Bank established.
 1859 – British Protestant Cemetery established.
 1863 – Tudela-Bilbao railway begins operating.
 1870 – Population: 17,649.
 1874 – February–May: Town besieged by Carlist forces.
 1877 – San Antón Bridge built.
 1882 – Bilbao-Atxuri Station built.
 1886
 Orfeón Bilbaíno (choir) founded.
 University of Deusto opened.
 1887 – Population: 50,772.
 1890
 Stock Exchange founded.
 Teatro Arriaga built.
 May: Ironworkers strike.
 1892 – Bilbao City Hall built.
 1893 – Vizcaya Bridge built.
 1894 – Chavarri Palace built.
 1895 – Gaceta del Norte newspaper begins publication.
 1896 – Dry dock built.
 1897 - Population: 74,076.
 1898 – Athletic Club (football club) formed.
 1900
 Biscay Foral Delegation Palace built.
 Population: 83,306.

20th century

 1905 – A second dry dock built.
 1906 – August: General strike.
 1907 – Doña Casilda Iturrizar park created.
 1913
 San Mamés Stadium opens.
 Euzkadi newspaper begins publication.
 1914 – Bilbao Fine Arts Museum established.
 1922 – Bilbao Orkestra Sinfonikoa founded.
 1924 – Museum of Modern Art established.
 1937 – 19 June: "Nationalists capture Bilbao."
 1940 – Population: 195,186.
 1950 – Bilbao Airport in operation.
 1960 – Population: 297,942.
 1968 – University of Bilbao established.
 1970 – Population: 410,490.
 1978 – Great Week of Bilbao begins.
 1979 – City becomes part of the Basque Country (autonomous community) of Spain.
 1980 – University of the Basque Country established.
 1983 – In region near Bilbao, construction of Lemoniz Nuclear Power Plant ceases.
 1991 – Population: 372,054.
 1995 – Metro Bilbao begins operating.
 1997 – Guggenheim Museum Bilbao and Zubizuri footbridge open.
 1999
 Banco Bilbao Vizcaya Argentaria established.
 Euskalduna Conference Centre and Concert Hall opens.
 Iñaki Azkuna becomes mayor.

21st century

 2004 – Bilbao Exhibition Centre opens in Barakaldo.
 2006 – Bilbao Live Festival begins.
 2010 – Alhóndiga Bilbao opens.
 2011 – Iberdrola Tower built.
 2013 – Population: 351,629.
 2014 – 11 January: Pro-ETA demonstration.
 2018 – 10 June: Pro-independence, 202 kilometer human chain formed between cities of Bilbao, San Sebastián, and Vitoria-Gasteiz.

See also
 History of Bilbao
 
 

Other cities in the autonomous community of the Basque Country:(es)
 Timeline of San Sebastián

References

This article incorporates information from the Basque Wikipedia and Spanish Wikipedia.

Bibliography

External links

  (archives)
 Map of Bilbao, 1943
 Europeana. Items related to Bilbao, various dates.

 
bilbao
bilbao